77 Park Lane is a 1931 British thriller film directed by Albert de Courville and starring Dennis Neilson-Terry, Betty Stockfeld and Malcolm Keen. It is based on a 1928 play by Walter C. Hackett, and was shot at Walton Studios. A French-language version 77 Rue Chalgrin and a Spanish-language version Between Night and Day were made at the same time.

Premise
At an upmarket gambling house in Park Lane, a woman tries to save her brother from ruin.

Cast
 Dennis Neilson-Terry as Lord Brent 
 Betty Stockfeld as Mary Connor 
 Malcolm Keen as Sherringham 
 Ben Welden as Sinclair 
 Cecil Humphreys as Paul 
 Esmond Knight as Philip Connor 
 Molly Johnson as Eve Grayson 
 Roland Culver as Sir Richard Carrington 
 Molesworth Blow as George Malton 
 John Turnbull as Superintendent 
 Percival Coyte as Donovan

References

External links
 

1931 films
Films directed by Albert de Courville
1930s thriller films
British films about gambling
British thriller films
British multilingual films
Films shot at Nettlefold Studios
British black-and-white films
British films based on plays
1931 multilingual films
1930s English-language films
1930s British films